Christopher David "Chris" Castor (born 	April 13, 1960) is a former professional American football player who played wide receiver for the Seattle Seahawks. Castor also played college football at Duke University and was named to the 2014 ACC Football Legends Class. He is known as one of the fastest players of his time.

Early life 
Castor was born in Burlington, North Carolina, but grew up in Cary, North Carolina and graduated from Cary High School in 1978. He played football at both West Cary Junior High School and Cary High School, as well as track at Cary High School where he excelled at high hurdles, long jump, and sprinting.

Duke University 
Castor received a football scholarship for Duke University where he established the single-season record for average yards per reception (20.70) in 1982, He also caught 46 passes for 952 yards and 13 touchdowns during his senior year at Duke, becoming the ACC Player of the Year and a second-team All-America selection by the Associated Press.

Professional career 
In the 1983 USFL Draft, Castor was a fifth round selection of Tampa Bay Bandits. Although Tampa Bay offered him $35,000 a year with a $10,000 signing bonus, Castor decided to wait for the NFL Draft and did not sign. During the NFL Draft, Castor was selected in the fifth round by the Seattle Seahawks. 

Castor played for the Seahawks for the 1983 and 1984 seasons. In 1985, he was placed on reserve because of a broken clavicle. He retired from professional football in 1986, expressing desire to coach.

Honors 
In 1994, Castor was inducted into the Cary High School Imps' Hall of Fame for football and track. His high school football number, 86, was retired by the school in 1997 as part of their 75th football anniversary.

In 2014, the Atlantic Coast Conference named Castor to the All-Time ACC Football Legends.

Personal life 
Castor currently lives in Cary, N.C. and is the Director of Facility Services with SAS Institute.

References

1960 births
Living people
American football wide receivers
Duke Blue Devils football players
Seattle Seahawks players